Adriano Russo (born 6 June 1987) is an Italian footballer who plays as a defender.

Career
He scored his first Serie A goal for Frosinone on 17 April 2016 in a 2–1 defeat of Hellas Verona.

References

External links 

1987 births
Living people
Footballers from Naples
Italian footballers
Association football defenders
Serie A players
Serie B players
Serie C players
Serie D players
A.C.N. Siena 1904 players
U.S. Massese 1919 players
A.S.D. Olimpia Colligiana players
A.C. Perugia Calcio players
Frosinone Calcio players
Liga I players
FC Voluntari players
Italian expatriate footballers
Italian expatriate sportspeople in Romania
Expatriate footballers in Romania